Charles Louis Simonneau (baptised 3 August 1645, Orléans – 22 March 1728, Paris), was a French engraver.

Biography
According to Houbraken he made engravings for a series titled "Effigies Raymundi la Fage". He is the younger brother of Charles Louis Simonneau.

According to the RKD he was a contributor to works used by Jan van der Brugge, who was a great admirer of Raymond Lafage. He was a painter as well as an engraver.

References

1645 births
1728 deaths
French engravers
Artists from Orléans